Lorenz Kindtner (born 13 October 1971) is an Australian soccer player.

Playing career

Club career
After playing at the AIS and Sunshine George Cross, Kindtner played almost a decade in Belgium, playing for a number of teams including Club Brugge and Cercle Brugge.

In 2009, Kindter played for Richmond SC in the Victorian Premier League.

International career
Kindtner played one match for Australia against Saudi Arabia in Riyadh in 1996.

References

1971 births
Living people
Soccer players from Melbourne
Caroline Springs George Cross FC players
Club Brugge KV players
Australian expatriate soccer players
Expatriate footballers in Belgium
Sint-Truidense V.V. players
Australia international soccer players
Cercle Brugge K.S.V. players
K.S.V. Roeselare players
Belgian Pro League players
K.R.C. Zuid-West-Vlaanderen players
Association football defenders
Australian soccer players
Australian Institute of Sport soccer players
Australian expatriate sportspeople in Belgium
Australia under-20 international soccer players
Australia under-23 international soccer players